The William Carmer House is a single-family home located at 10448 Washburn Road in Ortonville, Michigan. It was listed on the National Register of Historic Places in 1982.

History
William Carmer moved from Erie County, New York to this area in 1844. It is unclear when he constructed this house.

Description
The William Carmer House consists of two rectangular masses: a small single-story section and a larger one-and-one-half-story section. The sections are joined at a corner, suggesting that the building was constructed in two stages. The larger section has Classical detailing such as  the framed entrance, fluted corner pilasters, a wide frieze, and a cornice with returns.

References

		
National Register of Historic Places in Genesee County, Michigan
Greek Revival architecture in Michigan